The Wildenburger Kopf is a mountain that reaches a height of  in the Idar Forest in the Hunsrück mountains near the village of Kempfeld. There is a viewing tower at the summit which has been recently been built into the ruins of Wildenburg Castle. The Wildenburg Nature Reserve runs from the Wildenburger Kopf in a northeasterly direction along a rocky ridge.

References

External links 
 Die Wildenburg bei Kempfeld private website: Kulturlandschaft Nahetal und Hunsrück

Mountains under 1000 metres
Mountains and hills of Rhineland-Palatinate
Mountains and hills of the Hunsrück